Daniel James Dillon (born 19 March 1986) is an Australian professional basketball player who last played for the Waverley Falcons of the NBL1 South. He played college basketball for the Arizona Wildcats before starting his professional career in the Australian NBL. He has since played in Europe and Asia.

Early life
Dillon was born in Melbourne, Australia. He grew up in the Melbourne suburb of Hampton. In 2003, he moved to the United States to attend North Laurel High School in London, Kentucky. He averaged 23 points, 10 rebounds and six assists per game for the school's basketball team.

College career
Dillon had a four-year college basketball career with the Arizona Wildcats under coach Lute Olson from 2004 to 2008. He played sparingly for the Wildcats, averaging 1.6 points and 10.5 minutes in 113 career games with six starts. As a senior in 2007–08, he averaged 2.0 points, 1.3 assists and 14.4 minutes in 30 games with five starts.

Professional career
Dillon's post-college career began with a spot on the Milwaukee Bucks roster for the Las Vegas Summer League in July 2008. He appeared in one game for the Bucks, recording one rebound in seven minutes.

Following his stint with the Bucks, Dillon returned to Australia and joined the South Dragons as a development player for the 2008–09 NBL season. In March 2009, he was a member of the Dragons' championship-winning team when they defeated the Melbourne Tigers 3–2 in the NBL Grand Final series. He appeared in game three and game five of the series. In 12 games, he averaged 1.8 points per game. He went on to win the 2009 SEABL South Men Australian Youth Player of the Year as a member of the Sandringham Sabres. In February 2010, he travelled with a SEABL Select Team to Doha to play the Qatar national team in a two-game friendly series.

After another successful season in the SEABL in 2010 with the Sabres, Dillon joined the Cairns Taipans for the 2010–11 NBL season. He helped the Taipans reach their maiden NBL Grand Final series, where they were defeated 2–1 by the New Zealand Breakers.

After helping the Waverley Falcons win the championship in the Big V in 2011, Dillon joined the Melbourne Tigers ahead of the 2011–12 NBL season. After initially agreeing to terms to stay at the Taipans, Dillon signed a three-year deal with his hometown team. However, he left after just one season. He then re-joined the Waverley Falcons for the 2012 season.

In September 2012, Dillon signed with Romanian team CSM Oradea, where he went on to spend three seasons.

In August 2015, Dillon signed with PGE Turów Zgorzelec of the Polish Basketball League. In 32 league games for Turów in 2015–16, he averaged 16.3 points, 4.6 rebounds and 5.7 assists per game. He also averaged 15.5 points, 4.7 rebounds, 4.8 assists and 2.5 steals in six FIBA EuroCup Challenge games.

In August 2016, Dillon signed with the Hiroshima Dragonflies of the Japanese B.League. In 63 games for Hiroshima, he averaged 11.9 points, 4.0 rebounds and 2.6 assists per game.

On 16 June 2017, Dillon signed with the Kilsyth Cobras for the rest of the 2017 SEABL season. Six days later, he signed with Melbourne United for the 2017–18 NBL season. However, on 10 July 2017, he was ruled out for six to eight months after suffering an Achilles injury two days earlier playing for Kilsyth. He was a member of Melbourne's championship-winning team in March 2018. In April 2018, he joined the Waverley Falcons of the Big V.

In August 2018, Dillon signed with Paris Basketball of the LNB Pro B. In 33 games, he averaged 9.7 points, 3.9 rebounds and 4.7 assists per game.

On 16 May 2019, Dillon signed a two-year deal with the Adelaide 36ers. In 24 games for the 36ers during the 2019–20 NBL season, he averaged 3.5 points, 1.1 rebounds and 1.0 assists per game.

On 25 February 2020, Dillon signed with Polish team Polpharma Starogard Gdański for the rest of the 2019–20 PLK season, returning to the country for a second stint.

In 30 games for the 36ers during the 2020–21 NBL season, Dillon averaged 3.6 points, 1.5 rebounds and 1.9 assists per game. He then joined the Waverley Falcons for the 2021 NBL1 South season.

In 2022, Dillon returned to the Waverley Falcons.

Career statistics

College

|-
| style="text-align:left;"| 2004–05
| style="text-align:left;"| Arizona
| 23 || 0 || 5.1 || .444 || .400 || .500 || .6 || .4 || .2 || .0 || 1.0
|-
| style="text-align:left;"| 2005–06
| style="text-align:left;"| Arizona
| 31 || 1 || 10.4 || .326 || .269 || .714 || .9 || .5 || .4 || .1 || 1.5
|-
| style="text-align:left;"| 2006–07
| style="text-align:left;"| Arizona
| 29 || 0 || 11.0 || .400 || .346 || .478 || .9 || .8 || .3 || .0 || 1.9
|-
| style="text-align:left;"| 2007–08
| style="text-align:left;"| Arizona
| 30 || 5 || 14.4 || .327 || .355 || .889 || 1.1 || 1.3 || .4 || .0 || 2.0 
|- class="sortbottom"
| style="text-align:center;" colspan="2"| Career
| 113 || 6 || 10.5 || .361 || .333 || .651 || .9 || .8 || .3 || .9 || 1.6

References

External links
Arizona Wildcats bio
Daniel Dillon at sportstg.com (NBL)
Daniel Dillon at sportstg.com (SEABL)
Daniel Dillon  at frbaschet.ro 
Daniel Dillon at fibaeurope.com
Daniel Dillon at hiroshimadragonflies.com 
"Daniel Dillon tipped to sign with Melbourne United" at aussiehoopla.com

1986 births
Living people
Adelaide 36ers players
Arizona Wildcats men's basketball players
Australian men's basketball players
Australian expatriate basketball people in France
Australian expatriate basketball people in Japan
Australian expatriate basketball people in Poland
Australian expatriate basketball people in Romania
Australian expatriate basketball people in the United States
Cairns Taipans players
CSM Oradea (basketball) players
Hiroshima Dragonflies players
Melbourne Tigers players
Paris Basketball players
Point guards
Sandringham Sabres players
Shooting guards
South Dragons players
Turów Zgorzelec players